Pt. Bholanath Prasanna was an Indian flute or bansuri player.  He was born in Varanasi. He was the guru of celebrated flute player Pt. Hariprasad Chaurasia.

Career
Bholanath Prasanna learnt Indian classical music from his father Pt. Gauri Shanker of Varanasi, and from his brother Pt. Raghunath Prasanna.

Bholanath Prasanna was the recipient of various awards and honors including Uttar Pradesh Sangeet Natak Academy Award (1989) Category (Shehnai)

He spread and taught bansuri to numerous disciples among them are: Pt. Hariprasad Chaurasia, Pt. Rajendra Prasanna (Nephew), Pt. Niranjan Prasad, Ajay Shankar Prasanna (son).

References

Living people
Indian flautists
Bansuri players
Musicians from Varanasi
Year of birth missing (living people)